Sarah Sutton (born 12 December 1961) is a British actress.  She played the role of Nyssa in the BBC science fiction television series Doctor Who.

Early life 

Sutton was born in Basingstoke, Hampshire, England.  Sutton studied ballet as a child and was only 11 when she became the youngest British actress to have played Alice on screen, in a 1973 television film of Alice Through the Looking Glass.

She began acting at the age of nine in A. A. Milne's Winnie-the-Pooh.  She made her first appearance as Baby Roo  just five days after her ninth birthday at the Phoenix Theatre in the West End of London, 1970-1972.

Besides her performance as Alice, Sutton appeared in a number of television programmes before Doctor Who, including The Moon Stallion (1978) as Diana Purwell and The Crucible (1980) as Susannah Walcott.

Career 
Sutton portrayed the character of Nyssa, a Trakenite aristocrat, in Doctor Who. Her first appearance in the role was in the 1981 serial The Keeper of Traken. Initially, Nyssa was intended to appear only in one story, the production team later deciding to keep her as a continuing character. After joining the Fourth Doctor in the subsequent story Logopolis, her final full Doctor Who serial was with the Fifth Doctor, in 1983's Terminus.

Sutton took a break from acting after Doctor Who, focusing for a number of years on raising her daughter.  She made a brief appearance in Peter Davison's final Doctor Who serial, The Caves of Androzani (1984), played Sarah Dryden in a 1989 episode of the BBC medical drama series Casualty and Wendy in a 1992 episode of Unnatural Pursuits.

Sutton reprised the role of Nyssa in the 1993 Doctor Who Children in Need special Dimensions in Time, and subsequently in several of the Big Finish Productions Doctor Who spin-off audio plays from 1999 onwards. In November 2013 she appeared in the one-off 50th anniversary comedy homage The Five(ish) Doctors Reboot. In 1997 she starred in a special episode of the BBC’s dramatic reconstruction series 999 marking 10 years since the great storm of 1987.

Sutton also appeared in several episodes of MJTV's original audio sci-fi CD series Soldiers of Love as Colonel Franklyn. She also played Sharon in the Take 1 Productions educational video drama TravelWise (2000).

In 2001 Sutton starred as Sarah in Wirrn: Race Memory, a BBV audio reusing concepts from Doctor Who

In 2006 Sutton played Asaria, a role written specifically for her in the original  science fiction audio monologue The Jarillion Mercy.

Personal life 
In 1985, Sutton married Michael Bundy, a general practitioner. They have a daughter, Hannah (born 1991).

Filmography

Television

Radio and CD audio drama

References

External links

Living people
English child actresses
People from Basingstoke
20th-century English actresses
English television actresses
1961 births